Odites laconica is a moth in the family Depressariidae. It was described by Edward Meyrick in 1927. It is found in South Africa.

The wingspan is about 19 mm. The forewings are white with the costal edge pale yellowish. There are two or three small black marks or dots just before the margin around the apex. The hindwings are pale whitish ochreous.

References

Endemic moths of South Africa
Moths described in 1927
Odites
Taxa named by Edward Meyrick